Lake Opinicon  is a lake in South Frontenac, Frontenac County and Rideau Lakes, United Counties of Leeds and Grenville in Eastern Ontario, Canada. This shallow lake was formed when Colonel John By built the Rideau Canal. It also is part of the Great Lakes Basin.

Hydrology
The primary inflow is the Rideau Canal arriving, at the northwest, from Indian Lake over the control structures and lock at Chaffey's Lock, which gives its name to the tourist and cottage community located there. Secondary inflows are: Loughborough Lake Creek, at the east, which flows into Hart Lake and then into Opinicon Lake; and Rock Lake Creek, at the southeast, arriving from Lower Rock Lake. The primary outflow, at the northeast, is over the control structures and lock at Davis Lock to Sand Lake. The canal eventually flows via the Cataraqui River to Lake Ontario.

Recreation

This lake is a popular fishing spot and location for cottagers. The Opinicon Hotel, a historical resort, is located at Chaffey's Locks.

History
The Queen's University Biological Station, built in 1945, is on the lake. In 2010, the James H. Fullard Nature Reserve was created, situated on Sugarbush Island.

Settlements
Chaffey's Lock
 Lake Opinicon

See also
List of lakes in Ontario

References

Other map sources:

External links
 Chaffey's Lock and Area Heritage Society

Lakes of Frontenac County
Lakes of Leeds and Grenville United Counties